Ramy Mohamed Ashour (born September 30, 1987, in Cairo, Egypt), known as Ramy Ashour, is a retired professional squash player from Egypt, widely regarded as one of the best squash players in the history of the sport. He became the youngest player to reach number one in the world since the 1980s, as well as being the first ever two time World Junior Squash Champion. On April 22, 2019, at the age of 31, Ashour announced his retirement from professional Squash.

Ramy is known for his unique playing style, often referred to as 'The Artist'; he is regarded by many squash pundits, former and current players, to be one of the most naturally gifted players to ever play the game. Mohamed El Shorbagy, the 2017 world champion, once commented after losing in two world finals to him, as Ashour being 'the best of the best'; Jonah Barrington, also one of the Squash greats, ranks him as equal to Pakistani legends Jahangir Khan and Jansher Khan who dominated the game in the 1980s and 1990s.

An unfortunate turn of events left Ashour plagued with a chronic hamstring problem at the peak of his career. It almost certainly had an impact on his trophy cabinet, but Ashour himself took a characteristically philosophical approach to his injury, demonstrated in his various social media posts on the issue - citing his mental battle and desire for a full recovery. The injury itself came just after his 40+ match winning streak - where many players found it hard to play to his standard, which was defined by fast-paced rallies, reaction volleying and a unique insight into rally construction.

Career overview

Ashour won his first major international title in 2004 at the age of 16, becoming the youngest player ever to win the Men's World Junior Squash Championship. The same year, he helped lead Egypt to a second-place finish in the team event, behind Pakistan. In July 2006, he became the first player in history to win the World Junior Championships for the second time, defeating fellow Egyptian Omar Mosaad. He also led Egypt to a 2–1 victory over Pakistan in the final of the team event; the Egyptian team captured the top three positions in the individual players' event as well as the team event title, a feat no other team had ever accomplished.

In the same year he transitioned out of the junior division, Ashour reached his first major final at the Cathay Pacific Swiss Privilege Hong Kong Squash Open in 2006, where he lost to fellow Egyptian, Amr Shabana, who later would attain the number one ranking in the world. En route to the final, Ashour defeated world number ten John White, world number three Thierry Lincou, and world number two David Palmer.

Ashour won his first major professional title in January 2007, by defeating Palmer in 32 minutes (11–7, 11–3, 11–4), in the final of the Canadian Squash Classic. In April 2007, Ashour won the Kuwait Open, the richest squash event in the world, by defeating Amr Shabana, 11–5, 11–3, 12–10, in 34 minutes, after facing a 10-6 deficit in the third set. He then won the Qatar Classic in Doha by again downing David Palmer, this time with a score of 8–11, 11–9, 11–9, 11–6, in 66 minutes.  Also in 2007, Ashour was also invited to the ATCO World Series Squash Finals event, where he competed against the other seven top points earners of the season. The only player to go undefeated in all of his first three matches, he played French sensation Grégory Gaultier in the final. After a 62-minute battle, Ashour took the title 3–1 (12–10, 11–8, 4–11, 11–4).

According to squash legend and writer Malcolm Willstrop, "Ramy Ashour is something else — his movement is better than anyone in the game, and allied to his unique racket skills and vision, he lights up the sport. Not only that, but his modesty and engaging smile make him a rare commodity."

Ashour played Nick Matthew at the 2009 Saudi International Open, the outcome of which would determine not only the winner of the championship but also the next world number one. He won the match, his longest ever on the PSA tour, in a gruelling 110-minute, 5-game battle.

After losing his world number one ranking to his English rival, Nick Matthew, in June 2010, Ashour reached the final of the new PSA World Series Australian Open in August. Two weeks later, he battled to a 10-12, 11-9, 11-9, 9-11, 11-9 victory in a 90-minute match against Gaultier in the Hong Kong Open final. The back-to-back victories returned Ashour to the top of the rankings in September 2010.

He slipped behind Matthew again in early 2011, but Ashour then won the JP Morgan Tournament of Champions title for the second time since 2008, beating Matthew in the final match. This was his comeback tournament after recovering from a 2010 hamstring injury. A month later, Ashour played in a PSA World Series final at the North American Open in Virginia, losing to Matthew in a five-game match. At the 2011 Australian Open, Ashour beat Matthew, the tournament's defending champion, in another five-game match. The rivalry between the Egyptian and the Englishman continued when both played for their country in the WSF 2011 Men's World Team Squash Championships in Paderborn, Germany. Ashour (and Egypt) went on to win that encounter. Ashour furthered his attempt toward reclaiming his world number one ranking by defeating Matthew once more at the 2011 Rowe British Grand Prix, winning the match 3 games to 1.

Ashour's 2012 campaign was arguably the most successful of his career, becoming the first player to make the final of every tournament in which he competed since Jansher Khan.  After coming back from a long injury break in February 2012, Ashour made the final at the North American Open 2012, where he lost to the new world number one, James Willstrop. At the El Gouna International in April, Ashour won their rematch, collecting another major title in front of his home crowd after Willstrop pulled out of the final in the third game. At the Allam British Open in May, Ashour missed the opportunity to be the first Egyptian title holder, after Abou Taleb in 1966, by losing to his old rival and defending champion Matthew. Ashour then went undefeated in the second half of 2012, winning all four tournaments in which he took part. Specifically, he defended his Australian Open title in August, won the US Open title in October by defeating Grégory Gaultier, and took the Hong Kong Open title in November by beating Willstrop. This string of wins led up to his final victory of the year at the Qatar World Open in December. By beating Matthew in the semi-final, he would reclaim the world number one spot the following January, and by defeating his fellow countryman, Mohamed El Shorbagy, in the final after a gruelling five-game match, he gathered his second World Open title.

Although he did not play in the ATCO World Series final because of a hamstring injury sustained at the Qatar World Open, Ashour retained the world number one ranking at the first world series event in 2013, the J.P. Morgan Tournament of Champions. With his right leg heavily strapped, Ashour made it to the final, where he recovered from a 2-0 deficit against Gaultier to stage an unlikely comeback. By claiming another TOC title after his previous one in 2011, he became only the third player to win the prestigious PSA series title thrice since Peter Nicol did it in 2004. Ashour added two PSA world tour titles to his resume within two weeks. He beat his long running rivals, Willstrop and Matthew, in the semi-final and final of the North American Open in Richmond, Virginia, claiming his second North American Open title. Twelve days later, Ashour won his 30th tour title by taking the Kuwait PSA Cup (formerly the Kuwait Open). He defeated defending champion Willstrop in the final, and extended his run of consecutive major PSA titles to seven. In May, Ashour clinched his first British Open championship, becoming the first Egyptian to win the tournament since Abou Taleb in 1966. He also extended his unbeaten run to 41 matches, with his last previous loss taking place at the 2012 British Open final in London, exactly a year previously. After the summer break, Ashour won his ninth PSA World Tour title in a row and extended his unbeaten tour run to 45 matches by taking down defending champion Grégory Gaultier in the Netsuite Open final.

On November 21, 2014, Ashour won his third world title when he defeated fellow Egyptian Mohamad El-Shorbagy at the Squash World Championship in Doha, in a match that was described as "epic."

World Open final appearances

3 titles & 2 runner-up

Major World Series final appearances

British Open: 3 finals (1 title, 2 runner-up)

Hong Kong Open: 4 finals (3 titles, 1 runner-up)

Qatar Classic: 1 final (1 title, 0 runner-up)

US Open: 2 finals (1 title, 1 runner-up)

Career statistics
Listed below.

PSA titles (40)
All Results for Ramy Ashour in PSA World's Tour tournament

Note: (ret) = retired, min = minutes, h = hours

PSA Tour Finals (Runner-Up) (15)

Singles performance timeline 

To prevent confusion and double counting, information in this table is updated after the player's participation in the tournament has concluded.

Note: NA = Not Available

RAM Scoring System
On May 19, 2019, Ashour unveiled a new RAM scoring system at his first Ramy Ashour invitation at the CityView Racquet Club in Long Island City  NY that he developed with Osama Khalifa. The rules of the game are as follows (taken from RAMscoring site):

"Best of five games, where each game is three minutes long.

The three minutes of game time refers exclusively to actual play time and not the downtime between rallies.

Once the time is up, the clock stops, and the leading player must win one additional point in order to win the game. If the trailing player wins the point, then the game continues until either the leading player wins a final point, or the trailing player evens the score and wins an additional point to conclude the game.

For example: If the score is 8-5 at expiration time, then the leading player must win an additional point (point 9) in order to win the game. If the trailing player were to win the point, then the score becomes 8-6 and the game continues until the leading player wins the game 9-6, or the trailing player evens the score and then wins an additional point. In the event of a tie at expiration time, a final “sudden death” point is played to determine the winner of the game.

In the event that the time expires and the score remains at 0-0 (love-all), the 3-minute clock is then reset and the game resumes.

Time shall not be reverted unless only one of the below scenarios occur: For a “let calls,” the clock reverts to the start time of that point (“Time Revert Rule”)

If the 3-minute time expires and the score remains at 0-0, in which case the 3-minute clock is reset. There must be at least one referee and one “Time Keeper” to officiate the match. Players shall have 2 minutes of rest time between games. All other (Professional Squash Association) PSA and (World Squash Federation) WSF rules apply"

See also
 Official Men's Squash World Ranking

References

External links

 
 
 
 The emergence of Ramy Ashour at Squashsite.co.uk
 'Ashoured of Success' at Squashplayer.co.uk
 'Amr Shabana and Ramy Ashour Highlights' at mensvogue.com
 'Pair Of Aces' at Mensvogue.com

1987 births
Living people
Egyptian male squash players
Sportspeople from Cairo
21st-century Egyptian people